Anderson Conrado also known as Amaral (born 4 April 1978) is a Brazilian footballer who played as a defender in the Portuguese Primeira Liga with C.F. Os Belenenses.

Career
Born in Capivari, São Paulo, Amaral began playing football with local side Grémio Mauaense in the lower levels of the Campeonato Paulista. At the time, his teammates gave him the nickname Amaral because he had similar attributes to former midfielder Amaral. He would play for Palestra, São Raimundo (Manaus), Paraguaçuense and Grêmio Inhumense before moving to Portugal in 2003. Amaral made his debut in the Campeonato Brasileiro Série B with São Raimundo during 2002, and he scored a goal against Fortaleza in the 12th round.

Amaral made a good impression in his first season in the Liga de Honra with Leixões, leading to a contract offer from Primeira Liga side Belenenses before the next season.

References

External links
 lpfp.pt
 Brazilian FA Database

1978 births
Living people
People from Capivari
Brazilian footballers
Brazilian expatriate footballers
São Raimundo Esporte Clube footballers
Leixões S.C. players
C.F. Os Belenenses players
Primeira Liga players
Association football defenders
Footballers from São Paulo (state)